Sándor Rácz (born September 14, 1986) is a Hungarian racewalker. He competed at the 2016 Summer Olympics in the men's 50 kilometres walk but did not finish the race.

References

External links 
 
 
 
 
 

1986 births
Living people
Hungarian male racewalkers
Olympic athletes of Hungary
Athletes (track and field) at the 2016 Summer Olympics